The 1st Annual Awards.com Movie Awards were held on January 23, 2011. The nominations were announced on January 8, 2011. The results were used by counting how many praises the nominee got on the nominated movie's Metacritic page. The ceremony took place on its home website, the independent database Awards.com.

Winners and nominees

Best Picture
 127 Hours
 Black Swan
 The Fighter
 Inception
 The Kids Are All Right
 The King's Speech
 The Social Network
 Toy Story 3
 True Grit
 Winter's Bone

Best Director
 Darren Aronofsky, Black Swan
 Joel and Ethan Coen, True Grit
 David Fincher, The Social Network
 Tom Hooper, The King's Speech
 Christopher Nolan, Inception

Best Actor
 Jesse Eisenberg, The Social Network
 Colin Firth, The King's Speech
 James Franco, 127 Hours
 Ryan Gosling, Blue Valentine
 Mark Wahlberg, The Fighter

Best Actress
 Annette Bening, The Kids Are All Right
 Nicole Kidman, Rabbit Hole
 Jennifer Lawrence, Winter's Bone
 Natalie Portman, Black Swan
 Michelle Williams, Blue Valentine

Best S. Actor
 Christian Bale, The Fighter
 Michael Douglas, Wall Street: Money Never Sleeps
 Aaron Eckhart, Rabbit Hole
 Mark Ruffalo, The Kids Are All Right
 Geoffrey Rush, The King's Speech

Best S. Actress
 Amy Adams, The Fighter
 Melissa Leo, The Fighter
 Julianne Moore, The Kids Are All Right
 Vanessa Redgrave, Letters to Juliet
 Hailee Steinfeld, True Grit

Best Animated Feature
 Despicable Me
 How to Train Your Dragon
 The Illusionist
 Tangled
 Toy Story 3

Best Adapted Script
 127 Hours
 Nowhere Boy
 Rabbit Hole
 The Social Network
 True Grit

Best Original Script
 Easy A
 The Fighter
 The Kids Are All Right
 The King's Speech
 Toy Story 3

Best Art Direction
 The American
 Black Swan
 The Fighter
 Knight & Day
 True Grit

Best Cinematography
 Buried
 The Fighter
 The Social Network
 True Grit
 Wall Street 2

Best Editing
 127 Hours
 The Fighter
 Green Zone
 Inception
 The Social Network

Best Costumes
 Black Swan
 The Fighter
 The King's Speech
 Shutter Island'
 The Social Network

Best Makeup
 Alice in Wonderland
 Black Swan
 True Grit

Best Original Score
 127 Hours
 Hereafter
 Inception
 The King's Speech
 The Runaways
 True Grit

Best Original Song
 Burlesque - "Bound to You"
 Country Strong - "Country Strong"
 Tangled - "I See the Light" Toy Story 3 - "We Belong Together"
 Waiting for "Superman" - "Shine"

Best Sound Editing
 Inception
 Iron Man 2
 The Social Network
 Toy Story 3
 True Grit

Best Sound Mixing
 Black Swan
 Harry Brown
 Inception
 Shutter Island
 True Grit

Best Visual Effects
 Alice in Wonderland
 Inception
 Splice

Best Documentary
 Client 9: The Rise and Fall of Eliot Spitzer
 Joan Rivers: A Piece of Work
 Living in Emergency: Stories of Doctors Without Borders
 The Oath
 Waiting for "Superman"

Newcomer of the Year Award
 Chloë Grace Moretz

Multiple nominations and winners

Multiple nominations
Ten: The Fighter and True Grit
Eight: The Social Network
Seven: Black Swan, Inception, and The King's Speech
Five: 127 Hours, The Kids Are All Right, and Toy Story 3
Three: Rabbit Hole
Two: Alice in Wonderland, Blue Valentine, Shutter Island, Tangled, Waiting for "Superman", Wall Street: Money Never Sleeps, and Winter's Bone

Multiple winners
Three: Inception
Two: Black Swan, The Fighter, The Kids Are All Right, The King's Speech, The Social Network, True Grit

Trivia
This is the only award Nicole Kidman won for her performance as Becca Corbett in Rabbit Hole. She was still nominated for the Academy Award for Best Actress.
 Toy Story 3 was nominated for Best Original Script, though it's considered to be more of an adapted screenplay.

External links
 Yourawards Coverage

2011 awards